Moudjeria is a town and commune in the Tagant Region of southern-central Mauritania, founded in 1934 as an administrative post by the French.

Climate
Temperatures during the summer are among the highest in the world and can easily exceed .

Transport
The town is served by Letfotar Airport.

Notable people
 Hamadi Ould Baba Ould Hamadi, Mauritanian politician, was born in Moudjeria in 1948
 Yahya Ould Ahmed El Waghef, Mauritanian politician, was born in Moudjeria in 1960

References



Communes of Mauritania